Harold Dale Meyerkord (9 October 1937 – 16 March 1965) was a United States Navy officer who received a posthumous Navy Cross for his actions during a battle in which he was killed during the Vietnam War.

Biography 
Meyerkord was born on 9 October 1937 at St. Louis, Missouri to Harold E. Meyerkord (1913–2014) and Louise Foley (1918–2006). He was a 1955 graduate of Riverview Gardens High School, received a Bachelor's degree in Political science from the University of Missouri and was a member of the Sigma Alpha Epsilon fraternity. He graduated from U.S. Navy Officer Candidate School at Newport, Rhode Island, on 14 June 1960 and was assigned to heavy cruiser . Meyerkord was married to Jane Elizabeth Schmidt and had a daughter, Lynne.

Meyerkord reported to the U.S. Military Assistance Command Vietnam (MACV) in South Vietnam on 13 July 1964. He was senior naval adviser to the South Vietnamese 23rd River Assault Group, responsible for suppressing Vietcong operations in South Vietnam's "rice bowl" during the Vietnam War. The group probed the Mekong Delta waterways, engaging Vietcong guerrillas in operations in which Lieutenant Meyerkord distinguished himself for coolness, resourcefulness, and concern for his men. His radio callsign was "Hornblower", for Horatio Hornblower of the C. S. Forester series of books.

Navy Cross 
While leading his assault group into Vietcong‑held territory on 16 March 1965, Lieutenant Meyerkord's patrol was ambushed. Though wounded, he steadfastly returned the enemy's fire until hit again, this time mortally.

Lieutenant Meyerkord's heroism was recognized by posthumous award of the Navy Cross. He was also awarded the Air Medal for completing 20 low-level aerial reconnaissance missions under enemy fire. He received the Purple Heart three times for wounds received in combat.

Honors 
The U.S. Navy frigate USS Meyerkord (FF-1058), in commission from 1969 to 1991, was named for Harold Meyerkord. Riverview Gardens, his former high school, renamed their football field to Dale Meyerkord Field shortly after his death.

References

Further reading 

United States Navy officers
Recipients of the Navy Cross (United States)
Military personnel from St. Louis
1937 births
1965 deaths
Recipients of the Air Medal
University of Missouri alumni
American military personnel killed in the Vietnam War
United States Navy personnel of the Vietnam War